Romain Navarrete (born 30 June 1994) is a French rugby league footballer who plays as a  for Catalans Dragons in the Betfred Super League and France at international level.

He previously played for SM Pia XIII and the Limoux Grizzlies in the Elite One Championship, and the Hemel Stags in Championship 1. Navaratte played for the Catalans Dragons in the Super League. He has also played for the Wigan Warriors in the top flight and has spent time on loan from Wigan at the Swinton Lions in the Championship, and Catalans and Wakefield Trinity in the Super League. Navarette has also played for the London Broncos in the Betfred Championship

Background
Navarrete was born in France.

Club career

Early career
Navarrete began his career at SM Pia XIII, moving to Limoux when Pia left the Elite One Championship. In 2014 he joined Hemel Stags in League 1, making 6 appearances for the club.

Catalans Dragons
Navarrete joined Catalans Dragons in late 2014 and spent two seasons playing in the reserves team. He was called up to the first team squad in 2016 and made his Super League début on May 14, 2016, in the victory over Huddersfield Giants.

Wigan Warriors
On 5 October 2016, Wigan Warriors announced that they had signed Navarrette on a 2-year contract, for the 2017 and 2018 seasons.

In July 2017, Navarrette was loaned back to Catalans until the end of the season.

He played in the 2018 Super League Grand Final victory over the Warrington Wolves at Old Trafford.

Swinton loan
Navarette played on loan with the Swinton Lions in 2017 and 2018.

Catalans loan
Navarette spent the latter part of the 2017 season with the Catalans Dragons on loan from the Wigan Warriors.

Wakefield loan
Navarette spent the 2020 season with Wakefield Trinity on loan from Wigan.

London Broncos
On 9 January 2021 it was reported that he had signed for the London Broncos.

Toulouse Olympique
On 14 Jul 2021 it was reported that he had signed for Toulouse Olympique in the RFL Championship

International career
On 22 October 2016, Navarrete made his international début for France in their end of year test match against England in Avignon.

Club statistics

References

External links
Wigan Warriors profile
France profile
SL profile
2017 RLWC profile

1994 births
Living people
Baroudeurs de Pia XIII players
Catalans Dragons players
France national rugby league team captains
France national rugby league team players
French rugby league players
Hemel Stags players
Limoux Grizzlies players
London Broncos players
Rugby league props
Swinton Lions players
Toulouse Olympique players
Wakefield Trinity players
Wigan Warriors players